Arabian Center (In Arabic: أرابيان سنتر) is a shopping mall in Dubai which opened on 1 March 2009 and is managed by Al-Futtaim Malls. It is located at Khawaneej Road, Al Mizhar, near Mirdif in Dubai, United Arab Emirates.

On 25 November 2013, The Arabian Center was awarded the Silver Award in the category of Middle East and North Africa Shopping Center Awards at the ICSC Global Awards.

External links

References

Shopping malls in Dubai